"Naked" is a song by Falco feat. T»MB. It was originally released in 1996 as a single.

Later the song was included on Falco's 1998 studio album Out of the Dark (Into the Light) (released posthumously).

Background and writing 
The song was written by White Duke and Voye. The recording was produced by Torsten Börger.

Commercial performance 
The song reached no. 4 in Austria and no. 50 in Germany.

Track listings 
CD maxi single Spin 8622462 (EMI) (1996)
 "Naked" (Original Mix) (3:49)
 "Naked" (Sweetbox Short Mix) (3:05)
 "Naked" (Full Frontal Mix) (6:02)
 "Naked" (Sweetbox Filter Mix) (6:48)
 "Naked" (Sweetbox Club Mix) (6:13)
 		 	 
12" vinyl maxi single 8622926 (EMI) (remixes, Germany, 1996)
 A. "Naked" (Beam's Devil Dance) (6:52)
 B1. "Naked" (D-Syndroma House Mix) (5:27)
 B2. "Naked (D-Syndroma Night Mix) (5:58)

Charts

References

External links 
 Falco feat. T»MB – "Naked" at Discogs

1996 songs
1996 singles
Falco (musician) songs
Songs written by Falco (musician)
Electrola singles
EMI Records singles